Hans-Dieter Betz (born 29 September 1940) is a German professor emeritus of experimental physics.

Fields of research 
Beside atomic physics Betz searched on Sferics, where he leads a science-group on the Munich Ludwig-Maximilians-University.

Betz also investigates Radiesthesia and Dowsing, ten years in Order by the German Government. For example the extensive Munich Scheunenexperimenten.

References

External links 
 Homepage of the Sferics-science-group led by Hans-Dieter Betz
 In der  Sache Wünschelrute, Interview with Hans-Dieter Betz, ARTE 2005
 Hans-Dieter Betz: Unconventional Water Detection. In: Journal of Scientific Exploration 9 (1995)

Experimental physicists
20th-century German physicists
Academic staff of the Ludwig Maximilian University of Munich
1940 births
Living people